is an animated series directed by Junichi Sato and produced by TYO Animations in collaboration with Honda. The four-episode series was aired on AT-X on August 5 and October 7, 2012. It was released in two volumes on DVD and Blu-ray on November 28 and December 21, 2012.

Story
The story follows a young girl named Haruno Shiozaki and her friends who enjoy motorcycles and one day meet a curious motorcyclist named Cynthia.

Characters

The main character, a young girl who lives at the Niwa Café and motorcycle repair shop. She enjoys riding her Honda Giorno and has a habit of daydreaming. Having a rather pessimistic look on things, believing the impossible is impossible, she starts to change once she meets Cynthia.

Haruno's friend who rides a Honda Little Cub

Haruno's friend who rides a Honda Benly. She likes to compose songs with her pet dog Maro and get Haruno to sing to them.

Haruno's underclassman who simply rides a bicycle as she is not yet old enough for a moped license. She desires to drive a Honda Zoomer once she's old enough. She is quite fond of Cynthia.

A lively motorcyclist from Australia who begins working at the Niwa Café. She has ridden across many countries on her Honda CBR250R.

Another female motorcyclist who is friends with Cynthia.

Episode list

References

External links
Official website 

2012 anime television series debuts
Slice of life anime and manga
Yumeta Company